Libor Zábranský may refer to:

 Libor Zábranský (ice hockey, born 1973), Czech ice hockey player
 Libor Zábranský (ice hockey, born 2000), Czech ice hockey player